This is a list of episodes from the animated series The Looney Tunes Show, which premiered on May 3, 2011. The second and final season began October 2, 2012, and ended on August 27, 2013. A year after the series' original run ended, a previously unreleased episode aired on August 31, 2014, on Cartoon Network.

Series overview

Episodes

Season 1 (2011–12)

Season 2 (2012–13)

Footnote

References

Lists of American children's animated television series episodes